Darci Louise Shaw (born 17 April 2002) is an English actress.

Early life
Shaw was born in Liverpool and grew up in the suburb of Mossley Hill. She attended the Belvedere Academy. She took Saturday acting classes at the Liverpool Institute for Performing Arts (LIPA) from the age of 5 and then joined the Everyman and Playhouse Youth Theatre at the age of 14, participating weekly and appearing in the company's Fiddler On The Roof and Romeo and Juliet productions in 2017.

Career
Shaw made her film debut in 2019, portraying a young Judy Garland in the award-winning film Judy alongside Renée Zellweger, who played Judy in her later life. Rolling Stone described Shaw's performance as "truly stellar" but The New York Times felt Shaw was miscast.

Shaw played Holly Meredith in Morecambe-based ITV crime drama The Bay alongside Morven Christie and Chanel Cresswell. In 2021, Shaw began starring as Jessie in The Irregulars, a Netflix  paranormal show based on the world of Sherlock Holmes.

Sky UK announced Shaw is set to appear in a film about the British ceramic artist Clarice Cliff titled The Colour Room. Shaw will appear alongside Phoebe Dynevor in the lead role, as well as Matthew Goode, David Morrissey, Kerry Fox and Luke Norris.

Filmography

References

External links

Living people
2002 births
21st-century English actresses
Actresses from Liverpool
English child actresses
People educated at The Belvedere Academy